Alexandros Kontostavlos (1789, Chios – 1865, Athens) was a Greek banker, magnate and politician.

Biography
Konstavlos was born on the island of Chios in 1789 and descended from a noble family that traced its origins to the Byzantine Empire. After studies in Italy, he became a member of the Filiki Etaireia and during the latter part of the Greek Revolution served as an envoy to the United States for the purchase of warships. In 1828, Governor Ioannis Kapodistrias named him a member of the financial committee and sent him to Malta, where he purchased the mint that was used to produce the first modern Greek currency, the Phoenix.

Under King Otto of Greece, he was elected several times to Parliament for Karystos, and served as Minister of Finance on 5 October 1855 – 2 July 1856. From December 1856 to July 1856, he was Speaker of the Hellenic Parliament.

He died in Athens in 1865. His son, Alexandros A. Kontostavlos, was a diplomat and politician.

1789 births
1865 deaths
Speakers of the Hellenic Parliament
Greek bankers
Businesspeople from Chios
Finance ministers of Greece
Alexandros
Members of the Filiki Eteria
Greek people of the Greek War of Independence
Politicians from Chios